Xenandra is a genus in the butterfly family Riodinidae present in the Neotropical realm.

Species 
Xenandra agria (Hewitson, [1853]) present in Brazil
Xenandra ahrenholzi Hall & Willmott 2007 present in Ecuador
Xenandra desora Schaus, 1928 present in Costa Rica, Panama and Colombia
Xenandra heliodes C. & R. Felder, [1865] present in Brazil and Venezuela
Xenandra helius (Cramer, 1779) present in Costa Rica, Guyana and Peru
Xenandra mielkei Hall & Furtado, 1999 present in Brazil
Xenandra nigrivenata Schaus, 1913 present in Costa Rica
Xenandra pelopia (Druce, 1890) present in Colombia
Xenandra poliotactis (Stichel, 1910) present in Peru
Xenandra vulcanalis Stichel, 1910 present in Colombia

Sources 
Xenandra at Markku Savela's website on Lepidoptera
TOL

External links

Xenandra at Butterflies of America

Riodininae
Riodinidae of South America
Butterfly genera
Taxa named by Baron Cajetan von Felder
Taxa named by Rudolf Felder